Electrify America is an electric vehicle DC fast charging station network in the United States, with more than 788 charging locations and over 3,531 individual charging units . It is a subsidiary of Volkswagen Group of America, established in late 2016 by the automaker as part of its efforts to offset emissions in the wake of the Volkswagen emissions scandal.  In June 2022, Electrify America received its first external investor with a $450 million investment from Siemens for a minority shareholder stake, valuing Electrify America at $2.45 billion.

History

In 2015, the United States Environmental Protection Agency accused Volkswagen Group of using defeat devices in its diesel-fueled vehicles in order to hide from regulators that the vehicles exceeded emissions standards. The scandal quickly grew, leading eventually to billions of dollars of penalties and agreements to buy back vehicles, among other consequences.

One aspect of the program was a pledge to establish a public electric vehicle charging network.

The Electrify America brand was unveiled in January 2017, along with its first phase of station buildout. Its first station opened in May 2018, in Chicopee, Massachusetts. In 2022, Siemens became its first external investor with a minority shareholder stake and a seat on the board.

Electrify America, along with several other charging companies in the U.S., began drawing criticism in 2022 for a high rate of non-working public chargers.

Operations

Electrify America stations are frequently located in parking lots and parking garages of big-box stores and shopping malls. The company has multi-location agreements with Walmart, Target and Simon Property Group, among other companies.

Electrify America stations feature the major nonproprietary standards CCS, CHAdeMO and J1772, allowing nearly all EVs on the road today to plug in and charge. Tesla vehicles in the US use proprietary connector and require a special adapter that allows them to use standard CCS or CHAdeMO. Stations are rated to provide a minimum of 50 kilowatts and up to 350 kilowatts, although the actual output is dependent on multiple factors including the vehicle's capabilities.

Electrify America currently has agreements with various manufacturers for their electric vehicles to use its network of chargers or provide discounted charging rates or free charging, including Volkswagen, Audi, Harley Davidson, Hyundai and Lucid Motors.

As of 2020, Electrify America prices its electricity in most states where it operates based on the energy dispensed, charged by kilowatt-hour. In some states, users are charged by the amount of time their vehicle is plugged in. This is usually because the state allows only electric utilities to charge for the amount of electricity a customer uses.

The Electrify America charger network roll-out is being done in four 30-month cycles. , the company expected to install or have under development approximately 800 stations with about 3,500 DC fast chargers by December 2021.

Electrify America is also building a charger network in Canada called Electrify Canada, and added a commercial section in January 2021 targeting business, utilities and government agencies.

Charging 
Drivers can find stations through Electrify America's website, smartphone applications or through networks like PlugShare. They can pay for electricity through the phone apps or with a credit card at the chargers. The Electrify America mobile app lets users pay through their phone and receive discounted rates with an Electrify America Pass+ subscription.

, the network's chargers support Plug & Charge, a standard that enables an electric car to talk to the charger and handle authentication and billing.

The chargers support 50 kW, 150 kW, and 350 kW.

See also
Electrify Canada
Charging station
Electric vehicle network
IONITY

References

External links

 Electrify America
 Electrify Canada

Charging stations
Electric vehicle infrastructure developers
American companies established in 2017
2017 establishments in Virginia
Companies based in Reston, Virginia
Energy companies established in 2017